Eurosong may refer to:

Eurosong (Belgium), Belgium's annual selection contest for the Eurovision Song Contest
Eurosong – A MAD Show, Greece's selection contest for the Eurovision Song Contest from 2013 to 2015
BH Eurosong 2005, Bosnia and Herzegovina's selection contest for the Eurovision Song Contest 2005
Eurosong 2007, the Czech Republic's selection contest for the Eurovision Song Contest 2007
Eurosong 2008, Ireland's selection contest for the Eurovision Song Contest 2008

See also

Eurovision Song Contest